The Pyeongan dialect, alternatively Northwestern Korean, is the Korean dialect of the Northwestern Korean peninsula and neighboring parts of China. It has influenced the standard Korean of North Korea, but is not the primary influence of North Korea's standard Korean (the Gyeonggi dialect, the Korean language standard of Joseon-era Korea for roughly 500 years, is the foundation of standard Korean in both North and South Korea).

Pronunciation

Vowels
In the Pyongan dialect an eight vowel system is used (이·에·애·으·어·아·우·오). The sound of 어 is much closer to that of 오 compared to other dialects as it is [ɔ], the rounded equivalent to South Korean [ʌ̹]. 으 is also closer to [i] than to [ɨ], e.g. 그렇다 becomes 기렇다. However, the opposite is true after ㅅ. The palatalization that occurred for other dialects with 시 is absent in the Pyongan dialect, e.g. 싫다 becomes 슳다.  There are various features that differentiate the sound of words from southwestern and midland dialects. 위, 왜, 워 and 와 are closer to an original sound of 야, 여, 요 and 유.

Palatalization
The ㄷ (d) consonant, in addition to the first syllable of ㄱ (g) and ㅎ (h) are not palatalized in the Pyongan dialect (e.g. 뎡거댱, 정거장: chyŏnggŏjyang, chŏgŏjang).  Sino-Korean words beginning with ㄴ (n) in southern dialects are pronounced as ㄹ (r), as in the cases of 뉴행 (nyuhaeng) and 노동 (nodong).

Conjugation
Stems of the ㄷ, ㅂ, ㅅ irregulars use both forms, such as in the case of 듣다·드드니, 들으니 (tŭtta-tŭdŭni, tŭrŭni) (listening, to hear).

Words

Particles

Vocabulary
Various words used in the Pyongan dialect differ to that of other Korean dialects, such as 간나 (kanna) (sissy), 클마니 (k'ŭlmani) (father) and 클마니 (grandmother). The etymology of words such as "우틔" (ut'ŭi) (衣) arises from the Manchu language, but has been removed by the North Korean government in order to promote language purity.

References

Korean dialects
Korean language in North Korea
Languages of North Korea
Korean language in China